Nicholas Bilokapic (born 8 September 2002) is an Australian professional soccer player who plays for English club Huddersfield Town as a goalkeeper.

Career
Bilokapic began his career with Sydney United 58. He moved to English club Huddersfield Town, where he made his senior debut on 8 January 2022 in the FA Cup. He moved on loan to Hartlepool United on 31 January for the remainder of the 2021–2022 season.

International career
On 6 September 2019, Bilokapic made his Australia U-17 debut in a 3-2 defeat against England U-18s. He was selected as part of the Australia U-17 2019 FIFA U-17 World Cup side, however Bilokapic failed to make an appearance at the tournament.

In March 2022, Bilokapic was called up for an U23 Talent Identification Camp for Australian players based in the United Kingdom and Europe.

Personal life
Nicholas is of Croatian heritage. He is the nephew of former Australian international Paul Bilokapic.

References

2002 births
Living people
Australian soccer players
Sydney United 58 FC players
Huddersfield Town A.F.C. players
Hartlepool United F.C. players
Association football goalkeepers
Australian expatriate soccer players
Australian expatriate sportspeople in England
Expatriate footballers in England
English Football League players
Australian people of Croatian descent
Australia youth international soccer players
Australia under-23 international soccer players
Soccer players from Sydney